Oncidium cinnamomeum is a species of orchid endemic to northwestern Venezuela.

References

cinnamomeum